The Finnish Embassy in Washington, D.C. is Finland's embassy to the United States.  It is located at 3301 Massachusetts Avenue, in the Embassy Row neighborhood.

The embassy also operates consulates-general in Los Angeles and New York.

The modernist structure was designed by Heikkinen – Komonen Architects and opened in 1994. The Embassy became the first green embassy in the United States, receiving LEED Gold Certification in 2010.

The Diplomatic Finnish Sauna Society meets at the embassy.

Ambassadors

See also
 Embassy of the United States, Helsinki

References

External links
 Official site
 https://web.archive.org/web/20110213051016/http://www.finnleo.com/blog/2011/1/4/sauna-featured-in-wall-street-journal.aspx

Finland
Washington, D.C.
Finland–United States relations
Finland